The 1992 season was the Hawthorn Football Club's 68th season in the Australian Football League and 91st overall. Hawthorn entered the season as the defending AFL Premiers.

Fixture

Premiership season

Finals series

Ladder

References

Hawthorn Football Club seasons